Amanda Smock (née Thieschafer, born July 27, 1982) is an American triple jumper who competed at the 2012 Summer Olympics.  In college, she was a three-time NCAA Division II track and field champion. She won the triple jump events at the United States Outdoor Championships in 2011 and 2012, and at the Indoor Championships in 2011.

Early life
Smock was born Amanda Thieschafer on July 27, 1982, to parents Beth and Glen Thieschafer. She grew up in a small town in rural Minnesota - Melrose, Minnesota, where she began competing in gymnastics at age 4.  "There was this movie called Nadia after Nadia Comăneci, and I must have watched that thing 1,000 times," Smock later remarked. "I definitely was going to be an Olympic gymnast." Although her father was a gymnastics coach, eventually she realized she was better suited for track and field, giving up on gymnastics as a teenager.  In high school, she excelled at long jump, pole vault, triple jump, and sprinting events.  Smock graduated from Melrose High School in 2000.  She attended North Dakota State University for college on an athletic scholarship, graduating in 2004. In college, she was a three-time NCAA Division II triple jump champion.

Athletic career
Smock qualified for the 2008 Olympic Track and Field Trials, but finished fifth and failed to make the Olympic team. After the meet, her father took his credential and replaced the "2008" with "2012." He died shortly after the Trials, but Smock placed the credential where she would see it daily as a form of motivation.

However, her jump was just short of the B standard needed to participate in the World Championships. She failed to make the final at the World Championships, finishing 31st of 34 competitors.

At Worlds, she finished 26th of 30 competitors. At the games, she failed to advance out of the qualifying round of competition. Of her performance, she remarked "To be here at the Olympic Games is awesome, and I think with each passing year this is going to mean more and more, and the performance will kind of fade away." She was the lone female triple jump representative for the United States at the games. Smock said she would continue to compete for another year at least, but said it was unlikely she would try for another Olympics.

In 2014, Smock won the 2014 USA Indoor Track and Field Championships Triple Jump in 13.81 m (45 ft 31⁄2 in) but failed to qualify to the 2014 IAAF World Indoor Championships – Women's triple jump.

Personal life
Amanda Smock has been married to former college teammate Greg Smock since 2009.  She is part of the New York Athletic Club Track Team and is sponsored by Asics. Amanda has worked as a partner at a small business specializing in corporate wellness programs.   She considers herself blessed to not have to try to balance work and training.  She celebrated her 30th birthday on July 27, the opening day of the Olympic Games in 2012.

Smock is also a coach for Macalester College's track and field team, coaching long jump and triple jump.

References

External links
 
 
 
 
 
 Blog following Amanda's Olympic journey by her mother, Beth Thieschafer

1982 births
Living people
American female triple jumpers
People from Melrose, Minnesota
Sportspeople from Minnesota
Athletes (track and field) at the 2012 Summer Olympics
Olympic track and field athletes of the United States
World Athletics Championships athletes for the United States
USA Outdoor Track and Field Championships winners
USA Indoor Track and Field Championships winners
21st-century American women